The 2022 Guanajuato Open was a professional tennis tournament played on outdoor hard courts. It was the fourteenth edition of the tournament which was part of the 2022 ITF Women's World Tennis Tour. It took place in Irapuato, Mexico between 7 and 13 March 2022.

Singles main draw entrants

Seeds

 1 Rankings are as of 28 February 2022.

Other entrants
The following players received wildcards into the singles main draw:
  Gala Arangio
  Claudia Sofía Martínez Solís

The following player received entry as a special exempt:
  Adriana Reami

The following players received entry from the qualifying draw:
  Kaitlyn Christian
  Ellie Douglas
  Dalayna Hewitt
  Jessica Hinojosa Gómez
  Zoe Hitt
  Ana Paula Martínez Mora
  María Fernanda Navarro
  Erica Oosterhout

The following players received entry as lucky losers:
  Ana María Becerra
  Sylvia Schenck

Champions

Singles

  Zhu Lin def.  Rebecca Marino, 6–4, 6–1

Doubles

  Kaitlyn Christian /  Lidziya Marozava def.  Anastasia Tikhonova /  Daniela Vismane, 6–0, 6–2

References

External links
 2022 Guanajuato Open at ITFtennis.com
 Official website

2022 ITF Women's World Tennis Tour
2022 in Mexican tennis
March 2022 sports events in Mexico